Slinkard is a surname. Notable people with the surname include: 

Mary Lou Slinkard (born 1943), American politician
Rex Slinkard (1887–1918), American modernist painter and teacher

See also 
Slinkard Fire, a wildfire in Mono County in California